Helen Dale Moore (born 1970) is a British literary scholar, who specialises in medieval and early modern literature. Since 2018, she has served as the President of Corpus Christi College, Oxford.  She is the first woman to hold that position in the college's 500-year history. She is also an associate professor in the Faculty of English Language and Literature, University of Oxford. In 2021, she received the Rose Mary Crawshay Prize for Amadis in English: A Study in the Reading of Romance as one of the co-winners.

Selected works

 
 
 
 
 Helen Moore, Amadis in English: A Study in the Reading of Romance.  Oxford University Press. 2020.

References

 

 
 
 

Living people
British literary historians
Historians of English literature
Presidents of Corpus Christi College, Oxford
1970 births
Women literary historians
British women historians